John Rattenbury can refer to:
 Jack Rattenbury (1806–1844), Devon smuggler
 John Ernest Rattenbury (1870–1963), Methodist Minister 
 John Rattenbury (architect) (1928-2021), principal architect and planner for Taliesin Architects